The Aero 20 is an American trailerable sailboat, that was designed by Gary Mull as a daysailer and first built in 1999.

Production
The boat was built by Catalina Yachts starting in 1999, but it is now out of production.

Design
The Aero 20 is a small recreational keelboat, built predominantly of fiberglass. The hull design was based on the Independence 20, a boat designed by Mull for disabled sailors.

The boat is rigged with the unusual "aero rig", whereby the main and jib sails are on a common fore-and-aft boom.

The design displaces  and carries  of ballast.

See also
List of sailing boat types

References

Keelboats
1990s sailboat type designs
Sailing yachts
Trailer sailers
Sailboat type designs by Gary Mull
Sailboat types built by Catalina Yachts